This is a list of newspapers in Washington, D.C.  These newspapers are published  or headquartered in Washington, D.C.  There have been over 800 newspapers published in the District of Columbia since its founding in 1790.  At the beginning of 2020, there were approximately 75 newspapers in print in the District.

Major daily newspapersThis is a list of daily newspapers in Washington, D.C. For all publications, please see List of newspapers in Washington, D.C.. Dates the papers were founded are included.

Special interest newspapers

Community papers

College newspapers 
 The Eagle, American University, 1925
 The Georgetown Voice, Georgetown University, 1969
 The GW Hatchet, The George Washington University, 1904
 The Hilltop, Howard University, 1924
 The Hoya, Georgetown University, 1920, 
 The Tower, Catholic University of America, 1922

Magazines 
 Governing, monthly, 1987, Congressional Quarterly
 Metro Weekly, LGBT weekly, 1994
 National Journal, weekly, 1969, Atlantic Media
 Washington Life, monthly, 1991, Washington Life Magazine Group
 Washingtonian, monthly, 1965, 
 Washington Monthly, monthly, 1969
 Women's Monthly, monthly

Defunct publications 

Some selected, notable newspapers that were published in Washington, D.C. are listed below. See the main article for defunct newspapers founded in the District during the 18th- and 19th-centuries.
 The Colored American (African-American owned), (18931904)
 The Common Denominator (Washington, D.C., newspaper) (19982006), 
 The Current Newspapers (19542019) (community newspapers in Dupont Circle, Foggy Bottom, Georgetown, Chevy Chase and Upper Northwest)
 The Georgetown Current, Georgetown, Washington, D.C., (19672019), Weekly, 
 Voice of the Hill (19992010) (The Current Newspapers)
 Express, Free daily (20032019), Nash Holdings, LLC, Jeff Bezos 
 Farmers National Weekly (19331936), moved to Chicago in 1933
 National Intelligencer and Washington Advertiser (started by Thomas Jefferson),  (18001870)
 National Observer (19621977), published by Dow Jones & Company
 National Republican (1860–1888),  
 New National Era, New Era (1870-1874) (African-American owned newspaper)]
 The Spotlight (19752001), antisemitic, right wing
 The Suffragist (19131920)
 The Times, and Patowmack Packet (17891791), First newspaper in the District
 Washington Bee (18821922) ,  
 The Washington Daily News (19211972), predecessor to the Washington Star
 The Washington Herald (19061939)
 The Washington Star (18411981), a national newspaper
 The Washington Sun (19602010), African American issues
 United States Daily (1926-1933)
 United States Telegraph (18271937)
 Washington Times (1894–1939)
 Washington Times-Herald (1939–1954)
 Waterline (published for the Naval District of Washington by the Washington Post Company) 
 Young D.C., monthly tabloid by and about teenagers in Washington, D.C., (1991?)

See also 
 Media in Washington, D.C.
 :Category:Journalists from Washington, D.C.

References

Bibliography

External links
  
  (Includes DC newspapers) 
 
 
 
 

 
 
Newspapers

</noinclude>